Yuri Kordonsky (born 17 October 1966) is a Russian-born theatre actor and director, now a United States citizen and a professor of directing at the Yale School of Drama in New Haven, Connecticut. His theatrical career has been mainly in Russia, United States, Hungary,  Luxembourg, as well as Romania, where he has been associated with the Bulandra Theatre, National Theatre of Bucharest, Radu Stanca National Theatre", and Timișoara State German Theatre. As of March 2012, at least six of his productions were in the active repertory of the Bulandra.

Notes

Living people
Russian theatre directors
Romanian theatre directors
American theatre directors
1966 births
Russian emigrants to the United States
Yale School of Drama faculty